Reliquiae (Latin "relics") may refer to:

religious relics
Reliquiae (band), German band that plays rock-styled medieval music and folk music
Reliquiae (album), 2012 album by Swedish dark ambient project Atrium Carceri